Manon Rhéaume (born February 24, 1972) is a Canadian former ice hockey goaltender. An Olympic silver medalist, she achieved a number of historic firsts during her career, including becoming the first woman to play in exhibition game in any of the major North American pro-sports leagues.

In 1992, Rhéaume signed a contract with the Tampa Bay Lightning of the NHL, appearing in preseason exhibition games in 1992 and 1993. She spent five years in professional minor leagues, playing for a total of seven teams and appearing in 24 games. She also played on the Canada women's national ice hockey team, winning gold medals at the IIHF Women's World Championship in 1992 and 1994, and the silver medal at the 1998 Winter Olympics.

Playing career
Rhéaume, first woman NHL player, played for the Sherbrooke Jofa-Titan squad in the League Régionale du Hockey au Féminin in the province of Québec. She was the first female goaltender to play for a boys' team in the 1984 Quebec International Pee-Wee Hockey Tournament. Rhéaume was signed to the Trois-Rivières Draveurs in the Quebec Major Junior Hockey League, one of Canada's top junior ice hockey leagues, for the 1991–92 season, becoming the first woman to play in a men's Major Junior hockey game.

In 1992, Rhéaume tried out for the Tampa Bay Lightning; this was the first time a woman tried out for an NHL team. She played one period in a preseason game against the St. Louis Blues, allowing two goals on nine shots, and played in another preseason game against the Boston Bruins in 1993.

Also in 1992, Rhéaume was selected for the Canada national women's ice hockey team. She won gold medals at the 1992 and 1994 IIHF Women's World Championships, and was named to the All-Star team both years. She won the silver medal at the 1998 Winter Olympics in Nagano.

In 1992, Rhéaume was signed by the Atlanta Knights of the International Hockey League (IHL). Her first appearance against the Salt Lake Golden Eagles marked the first time a woman appeared in a regular season professional game. She played for seven different teams between 1992 and 1997, including Atlanta, the Knoxville Cherokees, Nashville Knights, the Las Vegas Aces, the Tallahassee Tiger Sharks, Las Vegas Thunder, and the Reno Renegades, appearing in a total of 24 games. While in Atlanta, Rhéaume wrote her autobiography, Manon: Alone in Front of the Net. She initially retired from professional hockey in 1997.

Later life
For the 1999–2000 season, Rhéaume was the goaltending coach of the Minnesota Duluth Bulldogs women's ice hockey program. She entered into the business world in 2000, serving as marketing director for Mission Hockey in Irvine, California, developing and promoting girls' hockey equipment for three years. She later worked in marketing at the Powerade Iceport in Milwaukee and with the Central Collegiate Hockey Association.

In 2008 Rhéaume suited up for the Minnesota Whitecaps of the Western Women's Hockey League, and in 2009 helped lead them to the Clarkson Cup finals of the Canadian women's ice hockey championships. On March 19, 2009, the Whitecaps, with Rhéaume in net, beat the Montreal Stars in a playoff game by a score of 4–3 in overtime, with Kim St. Pierre in net for the Stars. During the 2008–09 WWHL season, Rhéaume's Whitecaps took two of three games from the Calgary Oval X-Treme, snapping a string that saw the X-Treme go two years without tasting defeat in the regular season.

In October 2008, the IHL's Port Huron Icehawks announced plans to have Rhéaume take part in their training camp activities and play for at least one period of the team's exhibition season opener. On April 3, 2009, Rhéaume suited up for one game with the Flint Generals IHL team. She had been with the practice team since January, filling in for their regular goalie. Rhéaume is the third woman to play for the Generals.

In 2015, Rhéaume dropped the puck in the ceremonial opening faceoff before the first National Women's Hockey League game.

In October 2021, Rhéaume was hired by Bally Sports Detroit as an analyst and reporter for the Detroit Red Wings. 

She was a goaltender for the 2022 NHL All-Star game's Breakaway Challenge.

Rhéaume was hired in July 2022 as hockey operations and prospect advisor for the Los Angeles Kings.

Media and popular culture
Rhéaume guest-starred as herself in the made-for-TV movie A Beachcombers Christmas with Tiger Williams and Jyrki Lumme. At the height of her popularity, she was approached to pose for Playboy Magazine, which she refused.

In 2011, Rhéaume took part in the Quebec TV show Le défi des champions (Champions' Challenge), a show that trained eight Quebec athletes (such as Isabelle Charest, Bruny Surin, Marc Gagnon, Marie-Andrée Lessard, Étienne Boulay, Nathalie Lambert and Mathieu Dandenault) to the art of the circus.

In June 2016, Rhéaume was mentioned in an episode of the show Bones, (season 11, episode 18), as the only woman to play in an NHL game.

Personal life
Rhéaume was married to Gerry St. Cyr, a minor league hockey player and roller hockey player, in June 1998, whom she later divorced. They have one son, Dylan. A goaltender like his mother, Dylan St. Cyr played for the Michigan State Spartans and previously served as goaltender for Notre Dame and Quinnipiac University. 

After her divorce from Gerry St. Cyr, Rhéaume married her second husband, with whom she had a second son, Dakoda, a defenseman who was drafted in the 2022 OHL Priority selection by the Sarnia Sting, 124th overall in the 7th round. 

Rhéaume formed the Manon Rhéaume Foundation in 2008, which provides scholarships for young women.

She is the older sister of former NHL player Pascal Rhéaume.

Career statistics 
Career statistics from Eliteprospects or The Internet Hockey Database or The Western Women's Hockey League.

Ice hockey regular season

Ice Hockey International

Roller hockey regular season

Awards and honours
1992 All-Star Team, Top Goaltender
 1994 All-Star Team, Top Goaltender

Notables
First girl to play at the Quebec International Pee-Wee Hockey Tournament.
First woman to play in a major junior game [1991–92 Trois-Rivières Draveurs (QMJHL)]
First woman to play in a National Hockey League game, which also made her the first woman to play in any of the major professional North American sports leagues (September 23, 1992). [1992 Tampa Bay Lightning (NHL), played one exhibition game]
First woman to win a game in professional roller hockey
Played one game with Feldkirch.
2000–01 Montreal Wingstar (Forward)
2007–08 Little Caesars Senior Women's A Hockey Team (Playing as a Forward instead of Goaltender)

References

External links

 Manon Rhéaume at the Women's Hockey Web
 Manon Rhéaume: The Woman Behind the Mask at NFB.ca
 
 Manon Rhéaume Foundation
 
 
 

1972 births
Atlanta Knights players
Canadian women's ice hockey goaltenders
Detroit Red Wings announcers
French Quebecers
Ice hockey people from Quebec City
Ice hockey players at the 1998 Winter Olympics
Knoxville Cherokees players
Las Vegas Thunder players
Living people
Medalists at the 1998 Winter Olympics
Minnesota Whitecaps players
Nashville Knights players
New Jersey Rockin' Rollers players
Olympic ice hockey players of Canada
Olympic medalists in ice hockey
Olympic silver medalists for Canada
Ottawa Loggers players
Reno Renegades players
Sacramento River Rats players
Tallahassee Tiger Sharks players
Tampa Bay Lightning
Trois-Rivières Draveurs players
Canadian expatriate ice hockey players in the United States